An albedometer is an instrument used to measure the albedo (reflecting radiation) of a surface. An albedometer is  mostly used to measure the reflectance of earths surface. It is also useful to evaluate thermal effects in buildings and generation capacity with bifacial solar photovoltaic panels. Often it consists of two pyranometers: one facing up towards the sky and one facing down towards the surface. From the ratio of incoming and reflecting radiation the albedo can be calculated.

Measurement principle
The measurement of surface albedo of earths surface happens by using two pyranometers. The upfacing pyranometer measures the incoming global solar radiation. The downward facing pyranometer measures the reflected global solar radiation. The ratio of the reflected to the global radiation is the solar albedo and depends on the properties of the surface and the directional distribution of the incoming solar radiation. Typical values range from 4% for asphalt to 90% for fresh snow. Designs for a low-cost albedometer have been released with an open source hardware license which measures the reflection in 8 spectral bands in the visible light spectrum, additionally the system is equipped with a global navigation satellite system receiver, to georeference its position and an Inertial Measurement Unit to know its absolute orientation, make corrections in real time or detect errors.

Standards

ISO 9060
WMO No.8
ISO 9847
ASTM G207-11.

References

Meteorological instrumentation and equipment
Measuring instruments